Akwei Ransford Addo (born 21 July 1983) is a Ghanaian former professional footballer who played as a central defender or defensive midfielder.

Career
Addo was born in Accra. He previously played for Ken Harrison Babies Colts FC, FC Girondins de Bordeaux, Club Brugge, SWI Harelbeke KMSK Deinze, Royal Antwerp F.C., AEP Paphos FC and Shanghai East Asia.

On 21 January 2015, Addo transferred to China League One side Wuhan Zall.

Personal life
His older brother Eric Addo is also a former footballer.

Honours
Shanghai SIPG
 China League One: 2012

References

External links

VOETBALKRANT - Speler - Addo Ransford

1983 births
Living people
Ghanaian footballers
Footballers from Accra
Association football defenders
Challenger Pro League players
Chinese Super League players
China League One players
FC Girondins de Bordeaux players
Club Brugge KV players
K.M.S.K. Deinze players
Royal Antwerp F.C. players
AEP Paphos FC players
Shanghai Port F.C. players
Wuhan F.C. players
Ghanaian expatriate footballers
Ghanaian expatriate sportspeople in Belgium
Expatriate footballers in Belgium
Ghanaian expatriate sportspeople in France
Expatriate footballers in France
Ghanaian expatriate sportspeople in Cyprus
Expatriate footballers in Cyprus
Ghanaian expatriate sportspeople in China
Expatriate footballers in China